Nqrse, read as , is a Japanese rapper, songwriter, and vocalist from Nagasaki Prefecture.

Biography and Career 
Nqrse was born in Nagasaki Prefecture, Japan on 13 January, 1995. On March 23, 2013, at the age of 18, he started his musical activities by posting his original rap song "Emotional" on Nico Nico Douga. His Twitter account has over 500,000 followers, and videos featuring him have been viewed over a total of 550 million times. He is known for using a pink-haired girl character as his persona, which contrasts with his low-pitched rapping voice. His first solo EP, "NEGATIVE", was released in 2016.

He is a member of Internet rap collective StudioLama, which was founded in 2014. Since 2015, he has toured with other fellow utaite in the "XYZ TOUR" series, under which he performed at Yokohama Arena in 2019. In 2017, he released the album "Will O Wisp" in collaboration with singer Araki, for which he went on a tour of the same name. He has also appeared in Mafumafu's Hikikomori-tachi demo Fesu ga Shitai! (ひきこもりたちでもフェスがしたい！, Even if we're shut-ins, we want to do a music fest!) live performances since 2017. Notable venues he has performed in include Saitama Super Arena, Makuhari Messe, and Seibu Dome. 

In January 2020, he started activities under the group "AraNaruMey" (あらなるめい), with long-time utaite collaborators Araki and Meychan. Under their YouTube account, the group have been livestreaming and posting weekly, and also going on live tours.

Discography

Albums and EPs

References

External links 
 

1995 births
Living people
Japanese male singers
Japanese rappers
Utaite
People from Nagasaki Prefecture